Rajeswar Debbarma is a Tipra Indian politician from Tripura who won the election in 2003 as a candidate of Indigenous Nationalist Party of Twipra. He became MLA of Takarjala.

He was one of the prominent leaders of Indigenous Nationalist Party of Twipra who worked for the betterment of the indigenous people.

Political career 
Rajeshwar Debbarma started his political career from the Indigenous Nationalist Party of Twipra (INPT) in the early 2000s. He also elected as Member of Legislative Assembly from Takarjala Constituency.

Later, Rajeshwar joined Congress after repeated defeat of INPT in the subsequent elections. He joined the Bharatiya Janata Party after it came to power in 2018.

However, Rajeshwar quitted BJP in 2019 as a protest against the controversial Citizenship (Amendment) Act, 2019.

Rajeshwar joined TIPRA as having worked with its chairman Pradyot Bikram Manikya over the years. He was appointed as political secretary and has been one of the top advisor in the party.

References

Tripura MLAs 2003–2008
Indigenous Nationalist Party of Twipra politicians
Living people
Year of birth missing (living people)